Toni Onley  (November 20, 1928 – March 2, 2004) was a Manx-Canadian painter noted for his landscapes and abstract works. Born in Douglas on the Isle of Man, he moved to Canada in 1948, and lived in Brantford, Ontario. Later he moved to Vancouver and finally, Victoria, BC.

Among his works are many watercolours depicting the northern Canadian landscape. Onley created landscapes in the Canadian tradition, influenced by Oriental art. Icebergs, trees, water and coasts are the prominent features in these artworks. He also painted abstractly, particularly during the 1960s, when he produced his Polar series.

He was made an Officer of the Order of Canada in 1999. He was made an associate member of the Royal Canadian Academy of Arts (1963). He died at the age of 76 in a plane crash on the Fraser River near Maple Ridge, British Columbia while practising take-offs and landings in a Lake LA-4-200 Buccaneer amphibious plane.

Notes

Bibliography

Further reading

External links

Toni Onley's Official Website
Toni Onley, Lethbridge College Buchanan Art Collection

1928 births
2004 deaths
People from Douglas, Isle of Man
Manx emigrants to Canada
Aviators killed in aviation accidents or incidents in Canada
20th-century Canadian painters
Canadian male painters
21st-century Canadian painters
Canadian landscape painters
Officers of the Order of Canada
Accidental deaths in British Columbia
Victims of aviation accidents or incidents in 2004
20th-century Canadian male artists
21st-century Canadian male artists
Instituto Allende alumni
Members of the Royal Canadian Academy of Arts
Canadian collage artists